Piotroski F-score is a number between 0 and 9 which is used to assess strength of company's financial position. The score is used by financial investors in order to find the best value stocks (nine being the best). The score is named after Stanford accounting professor Joseph Piotroski.

Calculation procedure 
The score is calculated based on 9 criteria divided into 3 groups.

Profitability
Return on Assets (ROA)  (1 point if it is positive in the current year, 0 otherwise);
Operating Cash Flow (1 point if it is positive in the current year, 0 otherwise);
Change in Return of Assets (ROA) (1 point if ROA is higher in the current year compared to the previous one, 0 otherwise);
Accruals (1 point if Operating Cash Flow/Total Assets is higher than ROA in the current year, 0 otherwise);

Leverage, Liquidity and Source of Funds
Change in Leverage (long-term) ratio (1 point if the ratio is lower this year compared to the previous one, 0 otherwise);
Change in Current ratio (1 point if it is higher in the current year compared to the previous one, 0 otherwise);
Change in the number of shares (1 point if no new shares were issued during the last year);
Operating Efficiency

Change in Gross Margin (1 point if it is higher in the current year compared to the previous one, 0 otherwise);
Change in Asset Turnover ratio (1 point if it is higher in the current year compared to the previous one, 0 otherwise);

Some adjustments that were done in calculation of the required financial ratios are discussed in the original paper.

The score is calculated based on the data from financial statement of a company. A company gets 1 point for each met criterion. Summing up of all achieved points gives Piotroski F-score (number between 0 and 9).

Interpretation 
A company that has Piotroski F-score of 8–9 is considered to be strong. Alternatively, firms achieving the F-score of 0–2 are considered to be weak.

Average value of Piotroski F-score can be different in different branches of economy (e.g. manufacturing, finance, etc.). This should be taken into consideration when comparing companies with different specializations.

Other notes 
 Some improvements to the Piotroski F-score were suggested in Alpha Architect and American Association of Individual Investors (AAII) official blogs.

See also 
 Altman Z-score
 Beneish M-score
 Fundamental analysis
 Magic formula investing
 Value investing

References 

Financial risk management
Valuation (finance)
Credit scoring